Perfume is a 2001 American film directed by Michael Rymer and featuring an ensemble cast, starring Paul Sorvino, Leslie Mann, Jeff Goldblum, Mariel Hemingway, Rita Wilson, Jared Harris, Joanne Baron, and Michelle Williams. All dialogue was improvised by the actors. The film premiered at the 2001 Sundance Film Festival.

Plot
Prior to a major fashion show, various people involved in the industry find themselves embroiled in their own personal battles.

Lorenzo Mancini is a famous Italian fashion designer who learns that he's dying of cancer, but keeps the news from his former wife Irene and his boyfriend Guido while also trying to prevent his son Mario from changing their family business into a new line that panders to hip hop culture.

Camille is an up-and-coming fashion designer who's leaving the small atelier owned by Roberta Colaredo  to join the large fashion house Fantasia, for which her current lover, Jamie, works as a talent scout.

Anthony is a fashion photographer who has to reinvent himself after his signature heroin chic style has become overused and obvious. Janice Crawford, powerful chief editor of A Magazine, offers Anthony the chance to prove himself with a cover shot. In the meantime, Janice's estranged daughter Halley resurfaces unexpectedly.

Cast

Production 
The film was shot in 20 days in New York. All actors were required to improvise their own dialogue based on a detailed outline by Michael Rymer and L.M. Kit Carson.

Jeff Goldblum served as an executive producer.

Reception 
Todd McCarthy of Variety wrote, "Another attempt to nail the fashion industry, Perfume is more coherent and serious-minded than Robert Altman's mess Ready to Wear, but remains a less alluring creation." McCarthy noted the characters felt thinly developed and lamented how the film’s "lack of interest in exposition, basic information about the relationships of many of the characters — whom they work for and why they’re behaving the way they are — remains vague for a considerable time." Buzz McClain of AllMovie was more critical, writing, "In the end, you learn nothing about the fashion industry, you glean no insight into the characters, and you feel as if you've watched an acting class of self-conscious performers. If anything, Perfume only serves to point out how good Altman is."

Accolades
Independent Spirit Awards
 Nominated—Producers Award: Nadia Leonelli

References

External links
 
 
 

2001 films
2001 drama films
2001 independent films
Films about fashion
Films about fashion designers
Films about fashion photographers
Works about fashion magazine publishing
Films directed by Michael Rymer
2001 in fashion
American drama films
2000s English-language films
2000s American films